Forst in Unterfranken is a little village in the Schonungen municipality that lies in the district of Schweinfurt.
It has about 900 inhabitants.

Location 
Forst lies approximately 1/2 mile just north of the Main river along the southern exposed north bank of the Main river valley. At 923 ft (284m) above sea level, it is about 227 ft (70m) above the river.  Many new houses have been built, except in the old village center, due to the great view into the valley. The expansion predominantly took place to the west towards Schonungen.

History 
The village is first documented in the year 1183. The village was formed as a part of the free imperial city of Schweinfurt which was later given to the Count of Henneberg. During the Margravian War in 1553 and the Thirty Years' War the area suffered heavily.

Objects of Interest 
Forst's main landmarks include:
The old tithe house from the year 1567 and other fachwerk (Tudor-type) houses along the old roads which meet in the village center at the park
The war memorial and above it the natural stone spring in the village center park
St. Godehard catholic church
Boten-Steig Arena (soccer field) of the Forst sports club
Part of the old village wall in the rear church courtyard

Events 
Annual
Knutfest of the Forst sports club
Karneval of Forst
Parish fest
Party-Weekend of the Forst sports club
Church fest

Economy 
Wheat, rye, oats, rapeseed, beets, corn, and asparagus are cultivated in the surrounding fields
The cherries from Forst are well known within the region
Northeast, between Forst and Waldsachsen, are eleven wind turbines which produce 1 or 2.3 megawatts of electricity each
There are two family-run restaurants and one night club located in town

Traffic 
Forst is connected by county road, SW23, to state road B26. Likewise, buslines 8130 (Schweinfurt-Aidhausen) and 8156 (Schweinfurt-Hassfurt) of the Franconia Public Bus Transportation (OVF-Omnibusverkehr Franken) ensure good trafficability in all directions.

Personalities

Sons and Daughters of Forst 
 Sebastian König, TV narrator and actor
 Ron Mihalko, Former First Sergeant with the longest one station (Schweinfurt) overseas record, has lived in Forst since 1997.

References

External links
Information about Forst- In German

Schweinfurt (district)